The year 1930 in tennis was a complex mixture of mainly amateur tournaments composed of international, invitational, national, exhibition, team (city leagues, country leagues, international knock-out tournaments) events and joined by a marginal Pro Tour encompassing only British, German, French and American Pro events.

At the end of the Pro season the champion title was awarded, which in this year was given to the US Pro Champion. Vincent Richards held the title at the end of the year. The professionals were trainers in a major part those who accepted money for coaching. There were a few occasional professional against amateur challenges as well held in team competition format. The amateur events were almost all co-educated thus the majority included a mixed title contest. American Bill Tilden debuted this year on the European riviera scene winning almost every tournament he entered and took a dozen title partnering his protégé Wilbur Coen. The women's most successful players were Elizabeth Ryan in the European international championships and Helen Wills Moody, who won the two most prestigious tournaments in Europe, the French Championships and Wimbledon. Australian Jack Crawford also left his mark on the Continental tennis scene.

The most important team cups were the Wightman Cup for women and the Davis Cup (called the International Lawn Tennis Challenge) and the Mitre Cup (South American version of the Davis Cup) for men. The 1930 Wightman Cup was its eighth edition and was organized by the United States Lawn Tennis Association between the teams of Great Britain and the United States. The 1930 International Lawn Tennis Challenge was its 25th edition and was organized by the International Tennis Federation. The tournament was split into the American and European zones. The winner of each sub-zone played in the Inter-Zonal Final. Twenty-four teams entered the Europe Zone (including India, Australia and Japan), while four participated in the America Zone. The United States defeated Mexico in the America Zone, but then lost to France in the Challenge Round, giving France their fourth straight title. The final was played at Stade Roland Garros in Paris, France, on July 25–27.

Key 

 Q = Qualifier
 WC = Wild card
 LL = Lucky loser

 Alt = Alternate
 SE = Special Exempt
 def. = defeated

 w/o = Walkover
 ret = Retired
 d = Defaulted

This list includes men and women international tournaments (where at least several different nations were represented), main (annual) national championships, professional tour events and the Davis, Mitre, Wightman Cup

Pre-tournament season 
 In an inter-club challenge between the cities of Menton and Bordighera the former club was victorious with a match score of 10-4.
 Helen Wills married American banker Fred Moody and announced she'd use her married name Mrs. Helen Moody in tournaments.

January 
 On the January 3rd meeting of International Tennis Federation several Davis Cup-related issues were addressed including the suspension of the Romanian Tennis Federation as there were two rival tennis governing bodies existing in the country, the general usage of Dunlop balls as the official balls of the Cup and most importantly the dividing of the European Zone into North-European and South-European subzones.
 E. Angel became the British junior covered courts champion. Miss Jay was crowned the ladies' champion.
 VV. Jacobs became the American junior covered courts champion. M. Hecht was crowned the ladies' champion.
 The Australia Davis Cup team trials were held.
 Hamburg beat Bremen 22-8.
 Queen's Club beat Helsingfors L.T.C. 4-3 in Finland.

February 
 The Davis Cup draws were held on February 3 in Paris.
 W. G. Robertson became the New Zealander junior champion. He was crowned the doubles champion as well alongside M. Ferkins who also won the New Zealand Plate.

March 
 Geneve defeated Paris 10-9.
 Rhine valley beat the Blau-Weiss Club of Berlin 8-3.
 Bremer T. V. von 1896 annihilated Göteborg five to love.
 Romania Davis Cup team member László Dörner turned pro after the Hungarian international covered courts tournaments.
 At the March 23 meeting of the International Tennis Federation, the ITF rejected the idea of the USLTA about organizing the first "Open" tournament in the United States.
 Mexico gave a walkover to Cuba in the first round of the Davis Cup American Zone.

April

May

June 
 Belgium beat Finland in a non-official Davis Cup match in Brussels.
 The British amateurs defeated the British pros in the Chapel Allerton Club.
 Hungary lost to Austria with a score of 6–2 in a non-official Davis Cup match in Szombathely.
 On the 25th anniversary of the Deutscher Eishockey Gesellschaft Club of Prague it organized a ladies' only tennis event inviting several nations and many local clubs. Those present were the Weimar Republic, Austria, Hungary and Poland, while the Czech clubs were LTC Praha, D.E.H.G., I.C.L.F.K. and the host club among others. Altogether 16 teams and 48 women players competed.
 Kleinlogel became the German junior champion after beating Ernst. Sander was crowned the girls' champion after eliminating Horn in the final.
 Hamburg beat Helsinki four to one.
 The All England Club instated a dress code for women to wear pantyhose under the skirt after Helen Jacobs appeared barelegged on the center court in the Wightman Cup.

July 
 D.S. Macquisten became the Canadian junior champion.
 In the Davis Cup Inter-Zonal Zone final Giorgio de Stefani of Italy and Wilmer Allison of the United States set the current record of the most match points saved in a match with de Stefani losing after failing to convert 18 match balls.
 The Polish Tennis Association excluded Wanda Dubieńska.
 Adam Baworowski became the Austrian junior champion.
 Helen Wills Moody announced she'd skip the 1931 Wimbledon Championships.
 Albert Canet, Olympic doubles bronze medalist for France and contemporary president of the Fédération Française de Tennis died at the age of 52.
 The Four Musketeers defended their Davis Cup title for the third time.
 World Hard Court Championships doubles semifinalist Jenő Zsigmondy died.

August 
 The International Tennis Federation published the total income of the Davis Cup Challenge Round Final, which was 1,774,000 francs (~US$70,000).
 The German professionals led by Hans Nüsslein and Roman Najuch beat the Dutch pros five-love.
 The German ladies played a draw, six-all, against England.
 Japan Davis Cup team annihilated Poland five to zero.
 Japan won the tri-nations challenge in Berlin with six victories, Australia finished right behind with five and hosting Germany the last with four.
 In a re-match from last month United Kingdom Davis Cup team overcame Australia scoring 5–3.

September 
 The German pros repeated their feat from last month and beat the English pros to zero, while the English amateurs did so also in a best-of-nine match.
 D.G. Freshwater became the English junior champion, while the girls' trophy was awarded to Phyllis Brazier.
 Emil Ferenczy became the Hungarian junior champion, Csilla Lates won the girls' contest.
 American Clay Court and Canadian doubles champion Frederic Mercur was suspended by the USLTA for breaching the amateur rules.

October 
 Betty Nuthall's racquet, which she used during the US Nationals was auctioned for 4000 Deutsche Marks on the board of RMS Mauretania.
 The American umpires and line judges formed a union.
 The South American Davis Cup zone draws were held.
 United Kingdom beat Ireland. The Irish team only won one rubber.
 Germany and Italy's twelve rubber challenge ended in a draw.
 The joint men-ladies Indian tennis team defeated Scotland only losing the three mixed doubles matches.
 Gustaf V of Sweden was appointed honorary president of the International Lawn Tennis Club de France.

November 
 Augusto Rado became the Italian junior champion.
 On the last meeting if the ITF the split of the European Zone into North-South divisions was rejected.
 1924 Summer Olympics bronze doubles medalist Evelyn Colyer died.

December 
 Australia announced he'd skip the 1931 Davis Cup season as a sign of support of the rejected South African initiative for the Cup to be held every second year only.
 Two-time former Wimbledon champion Gerald Patterson's application for a renewed amateur license was rejected.
 The Lawn Tennis Association introduced two new rules regarding timeouts during play: It became forbidden to receive extra time to get coach advises or to pause for rest.
 Bobby Heine announced he won't compete in the Wimbledon Championships next year.
 It was revealed that the total income of the 1930 Wimbledon Championships was £37,024.

Unknown date

Notes 
  The Italian National Men's Championships were fought in a round robin format.
  The first official Open tournament was finally organized in 1968.

Rankings 
These are the rankings compiled and published by A Wallis Myers in September, founder of the International Lawn Tennis Club of Great Britain  and a second list based upon the ranks of Pierre Gillou, president of the Fédération Française de Tennis.

Men's singles

Women's singles

Professionals 
These are the pro rankings compiled and published by the American Lawn Tennis magazine in January.

References

External links 
Italian Wikipedia page of the Women's tour

 
Tennis by year